Bolsominion (from the English minion) is a pejorative term used by opponents of former Brazilian President Jair Bolsonaro to refer to a segment of his supporters. The word is an amalgamation combining the first half of the surname Bolsonaro, and the word minion ("servant", "follower"), which is also the name of the characters in the Despicable Me franchise. The term gained prominence in Brazilian media with the rise of Bolsonaro throughout his 2018 presidential campaign.

Ideology 

In general, bolsominions are described as extreme right-wing people who are uncompromising, reactionary and adept at military intervention to solve problems related to public health, education, security. They often use the term "esquerdopata" (pathological left) to refer to opponents, which is a term used on the internet to treat leftist ideology as a disease (psychopathy), to which its opponents usually respond by using the term "direitopata" (pathological right) to designate them. They see the relationship between military intervention and morality as closely linked factors and they are, in general, antagonistic to agendas considered progressive.

Many are also supporters of the Trump administration.

Use 
In 2019, federal deputy Eduardo Bolsonaro held his 35th birthday party with a theme that referred to the term Bolsominion.

See also 

 Conservatism in Brazil

References

Bibliography 

 
 
 

 

 

 

Conservatism in Brazil
Political slurs for people
Far-right politics in Brazil
Political terminology
Right-wing populism in South America
Despicable Me
Political neologisms
Jair Bolsonaro
Authoritarianism